The Ufa (Qariźel, Qaraidel, literally The Black Idel) is a river in the Ural Mountains, Chelyabinsk Oblast, Sverdlovsk Oblast, and the Republic of Bashkortostan; a right tributary of the river Belaya. It freezes up between late October and early December and stays under the ice until April or May. Pavlovka Hydroelectric Station is along the Ufa. The river's water is widely used for water supply. The main ports are Krasnoufimsk and Ufa (at the mouth of the river).

Tributaries

The largest tributaries of the Ufa are, from source to mouth:
 Serga (right)
 Bisert (right)
 Ay (left)
 Tyuy (right)
 Yuryuzan (left)
 Usa (right)

References

Rivers of Bashkortostan
Rivers of Chelyabinsk Oblast
Rivers of Sverdlovsk Oblast
Nature of Ufa
Ural Mountains